Sun Yat-sen University station may refer to:

 Sun Yat-sen University station (Guangzhou Metro), a station on the Guangzhou Metro in Guangzhou, Guangdong.
 Sun Yat-sen University station (Shenzhen Metro), a station on the Shenzhen Metro in Shenzhen, Guangdong.